The 19th Annual Latin Grammy Awards was held on November 15, 2018 at the MGM Grand Garden Arena in Las Vegas.

Performers

Winners and nominees
The following is the list of nominees.

General
Record of the Year
Jorge Drexler — "Telefonía"
 Pablo Alborán — "No Vaya a Ser"
 Anaadi — "É Fake (Homen Barato)"
 J Balvin and Willy William — "Mi Gente"
 Bomba Estéreo — "Internacionales"
 Kany García — "Para Siempre"
 Nicky Jam and J Balvin — "X"
 Natalia Lafourcade featuring Los Macorinos — "Danza de Gardenias"
 Monsieur Periné — "Bailar Contigo"
 Rosalía — "Malamente"

Album of the Year
Luis Miguel — ¡México Por Siempre!
 Pablo Alborán — Prometo
 J Balvin — Vibras
 Chico Buarque — Caravanas
 Jorge Drexler — Salvavidas de Hielo
 El David Aguilar — Siguiente
 Kany García — Soy Yo
 Natalia Lafourcade — Musas, Vol. 2
 Monsieur Periné — Encanto Tropical
 Rozalén — Cuando El Río Suena...

Song of the Year
Jorge Drexler — "Telefonía"
 Manú Jalil and Mon Laferte — "Antes De Ti" (Mon Laferte)
 Monsieur Periné — "Bailar Contigo"
 David Aguilar Dorantes and Natalia Lafourcade — "Danza de Gardenias" (Natalia Lafourcade Featuring Los Macorinos)
 El David Aguilar — "Embrujo"
 Rozalén — "La Puerta Violeta"
 Antón Alvarez Alfaro, Pablo Diaz-Reixa and Rosalía — "Malamente" (Rosalía) 
 Kany García — "Para Siempre"
 Mauricio Rengifo, Andrés Torres, Carlos Vives and Sebastian Yatra — "Robarte un Beso" (Carlos Vives and Sebastian Yatra)
 Fito Páez — "Tu Vida, Mi Vida"

Best New Artist
Karol G
 Ángela Aguilar
 Anaadi
 El David Aguilar
 Alex Ferreira
 Los Petitfellas
 Nana Mendoza
 Christian Nodal
 Claudia Prieto
 Benjamín Walker

Pop
Best Contemporary Pop Vocal Album
Maluma — F.A.M.E.
 Axel — Ser
 Pablo López — Camino, Fuego y Libertad
 Beatriz Luengo — Cuerpo y Alma
 Nana Mendoza — Miradas

Best Traditional Pop Vocal Album
Laura Pausini — Hazte Sentir
 Pablo Alborán — Prometo
 Mojito Lite — Solo Los Buenos Momentos
 Carla Morrison — Amor Supremo Desnudo
 Nahuel Pennisi — Feliz

Urban
Best Urban Fusion/Performance
Rosalía — "Malamente"
 J Balvin and Willy William featuring Beyoncé — "Mi Gente"
 Bomba Estéreo — "Internacionales"
 Daddy Yankee featuring Puerto Rico Symphony Orchestra — "Yo Contra Ti"
 Major Lazer featuring Anitta and Pabllo Vittar — "Sua Cara"

Best Urban Music Album
J Balvin — Vibras
 ChocQuibTown — Sin Miedo
 Coastcity — Coastcity
 Ozuna — Odisea
 Tote King — Lebron

Best Urban Song
Daddy Yankee, Urbani Mota Cedeño, Juan G. Rivera Vazquez and Luis Jorge Romero — "Dura" (Daddy Yankee)
 Anitta, J. Balvin, Justin Quiles and Alejandro Ramírez — "Downtown" (Anitta Featuring J Balvin)
 Rene David Cano, Andy Clay, Karol G, Rayito and Omar Sabino — "Mi Cama" (Karol G)
 J Balvin, Bad Bunny, Juan M. Frías, Luian Malave, Prince Royce, Edgar Semper and Xavier Semper — "Sensualidad" (Bad Bunny, Prince Royce and J Balvin)
 J. Balvin, Nicky Jam and Juan Diego Medina Vélez — "X" (Nicky Jam and J Balvin)

Rock
Best Rock Album
Enrique Bunbury — Expectativas
 Richard Coleman — F-A-C-I-L
 Él Mató a un Policía Motorizado — La Síntesis O'Konor
 Los Pixel — Ahora Lo Sabes Todo
 No Te Va Gustar — Suenan Las Alarmas

Best Pop/Rock Album
Manolo García — Geometría del Rayo
 Bambi — El Encuentro
 Comisario Pantera — Cosmovisiones
 Ella Es Tan Cargosa — La Sangre Buena
 Lucas & The Woods — Pensacola Radio

Best Rock Song
Fito Páez — "Tu Vida Mi Vida"
 Santiago Motorizado — "Ahora Imagino Cosas" (Él Mató a un Policía Motorizado)
 Richard Coleman — "Días Futuros"
 Enrique Bunbury — "La Actitud Correcta"
 Leiva — "La Llamada"

Alternative
Best Alternative Music Album
Aterciopelados — Claroscura
 Dante Spinetta — Puñal
 Telmary — Fuerza Arará
 Vetusta Morla — Mismo Sitio, Distinto Lugar
 Zoé — Aztlan

Best Alternative Song
Antón Alvarez Alfaro, Pablo Diaz-Reixa and Rosalía — "Malamente" (Rosalía)
 León Larregui — "Azúl" (Zoé)
 Guillermo Galván — "Consejo de Sabios" (Vetusta Morla)
 Andrea Echeverri — "Dúo" (Aterciopelados)
 Dante Spinetta — "Mi Vida"

Tropical
Best Salsa Album
Víctor Manuelle — 25/7
 Alexander Abreu and Havana D' Primera — Cantor del Pueblo
 Charlie Aponte — Pa' Mi Gente
 Chiquito Team Band — Los Creadores del Sonido
 Pete Perignon — La Esquina del Bailador

Best Cumbia/Vallenato Album
Silvestre Dangond — Esto Es Vida
 Alberto Barros — Tributo a la Cumbia Colombiana 4
 Diana Burco — Diana Burco
 Jean Carlos Centeno & Ronal Urbina — De Parranda
 Juan Piña — La Elegancia de la Música

Best Contemporary Tropical Album
Carlos Vives — Vives
 Elvis Crespo — Diomedizao
 Milton Salcedo — Presenta: Swing 80
 Daniel Santacruz — Momentos de Cine
 Romeo Santos — Golden

Best Traditional Tropical Album
José Alberto "El Canario" and El Septeto Santiaguero — A Mi Qué - Tributo a los Clásicos Cubanos
 Rubén Blades with Roberto Delgado & Orquesta — Medoro Madera
 Sonora Santanera — La Fiesta Continúa
 Omara Portuondo — Omara Siempre
 María Rivas — Motivos

Best Tropical Fusion Album
Aymée Nuviola — Como Anillo al Dedo
 Manny Cruz — Sobrenatural
 Diego Gutiérrez — Palante el Mambo!
 Sheila King — Supernova
 Safara — Cucucuprá, Cuprá

Best Tropical Song
Juan Luis Guerra, Juan Carlos Luces and Víctor Manuelle — "Quiero Tiempo" (Víctor Manuelle featuring Juan Luis Guerra)
 Silvestre Dangond, Nicky Jam, Juan Medina, Mauricio Rengifo and Andrés Torres — "Casate Conmigo" (Silvestre Dangond featuring Nicky Jam)
 Jorge Luis Piloto — "Enamórate Bailando" (Reynier Pérez y Su Septeto Acarey featuring Gilberto Santa Rosa)
 Jorge Luis Piloto, Jean Rodríguez and Tony Succar — "Me Enamoro Más De Ti" (Tony Succar featuring Jean Rodríguez)
 Fonseca, Mauricio Rengifo and Andrés Torres — "Simples Corazones" (Fonseca)

Songwriter
Best Singer-Songwriter Album
Jorge Drexler — Salvavidas de Hielo
 El David Aguilar — Siguiente
 Kany García — Soy Yo
 Claudia Prieto — Compositores
 Raquel Sofía — 2:00 AM

Regional Mexican
Best Ranchero/Mariachi Album
Luis Miguel — ¡México Por Siempre!
 Ángela Aguilar — Primero Soy Mexicana
 Tania Libertad — Jose Alfredo y Yo
 Mariachi Sol De México De José Hernández - Leyendas de Mi Pueblo
 Christian Nodal — Me Dejé Llevar

Best Banda Album
Banda Los Recoditos — Los Gustos Que Me Doy
 Banda Los Sebastianes — En Vida
 Luis Coronel — Ahora Soy Yo
 Jerry Demara — Brindemos
 El Fantasma y Su Equipo Armado — En El Camino

Best Tejano Album
Roger Velásquez & The Latin Legendz — Tex Mex Funk
 Jimmy Gonzalez y Grupo Mazz — Porque Todavía Te Quiero
 Grupo Alamo — Próximo Nivel
 Proyecto Insomnio  — Dolce Inferno: Dolce
 Michael Salgado  — Otras Historias

Best Norteño Album
Calibre 50  — Guerra de Poder
Pesado  — Los Ángeles Existen
 Adrián Acosta — Irremplazable
 Conjunto Primavera  — Con Toda La Fuerza
 Voz de Mando  — El Que A Ti Te Gusta

Best Regional Song
Christian Nodal — "Probablemente"
 Domingo Leiva Delgado — "Arránquense Muchachos" (Pedro Fernández)
 Gabriel Flores and Yoel Henríquez — "Ayúdame A Olvidarte" (La Explosiva Banda De Maza)
 Edén Muñoz — "Corrido De Juanito" (Calibre 50)
 Salvador Hurtado — "El Sueño Americano" (La Energía Norteña)

Instrumental
Best Instrumental Album
Miguel Siso — Identidad
 Yamandu Costa — Recanto
 Hamilton De Holanda Trio — Hamilton De Holanda Trio - Jacob 10ZZ
 Airto Moreira — Aluê
 Hermeto Pascoal & Grupo — No Mundo Dos Sons

Traditional
Best Folk Album
Natalia Lafourcade — Musas, Vol. 2
 Afrodisíaco — Viene De Panamá (Sin Raíz No Hay País)
 Eva Ayllón — Clavo y Canela
 Marta Gómez — La Alegría y El Canto
 María Mulata — Idas y Vueltas
 Yubá-Iré — ¡Baila Conmigo!

Best Tango Album
Pedro Giraudo — Vigor Tanguero
 Daniel Binelli and Nick Danielson — Nostalgias
 Rodolfo Mederos Trio — Troilo Por Mederos, En Su Huella
 Omar Mollo and Gran Orquesta Típica Otra — Tango Cosmopolita
 Miguel Pereiro — Mística Ciudad

Best Flamenco Album
Arcángel — Al Este del Canto
 Dani de Morón — 21
 Alba Molina — Caminando con Manuel
 Rosario La Tremendita — Delirium Tremens
 Samuel Serrano — Dos Caminos

Jazz
Best Latin Jazz Album
Hermeto Pascoal and Big Band — Naturaleza Universal
 Adrian Iaies Trio — La Casa de un Pianista de Jazz
 Dafnis Prieto Big Band — Back to the Sunset
 Néstor Torres  — Jazz Flute Traditions
 Bobby Valentin and The Latin Jazzists — Mind of a Master

Christian
Best Christian Album (Spanish Language)
Alfareros — Setenta Veces Siete
 Andy Alemany — Tú Primero
 Daniel Calveti — Habla Sobre Mí
 Marcela Gándara — Cerca Estás
 Miel San Marcos — Pentecostés (En Vivo)

Best Christian Album (Portuguese Language)
Fernanda Brum — Som Da Minha Vida
 Cassiane — Nivél Do Céu
 Anderson Freire — Contagem Regressiva
 Pr. Lucas — Pintor Do Mundo
 Léa Mendonça — Adoração Na Guerra Ao Vivo

Portuguese Language 
Best Portuguese Language Contemporary Pop Album
Anaadi — Noturno
 Erasmo Carlos — Amor é Isso
 Iza — Dona de Mim
 Ana Vilela  — Ana Vilela
 Xenia — Xenia

Best Portuguese Language Rock or Alternative Album
Lenine — Lenine Em Trânsito
 Tim Bernardes — Recomeçar
 Kassin — Relax
 Rubel  — Casas
 Jay Vaquer — Ecos Do Acaso e Casos De Caos

Best Samba/Pagode Album
Maria Rita  — Amor E Música
 Martinho da Vila — Alô Vila Isabeeeel!!!
 Ferrugem — Prazer, Eu Sou Ferrugem
 Diogo Nogueira — Munduê
 Thiaguinho — Só Vem! Ao Vivo

Best MPB Album
Chico Buarque — Caravanas
 João Bosco — Mano Que Zuera
 Edu Lobo, Dori Caymmi and Marcos Valle — Edu, Dori e Marcos
 Vitor Ramil  — Campos Neutrais
 Elza Soares — Deus é Mulher

Best Sertaneja Music Album
Chitãozinho & Xororó  — Elas Em Evidências
 Solange Almeida — Sentimento de Mulher
 As Galvão — 70 Anos
 Naiara Azevedo — Contraste
 Zezé Di Camargo & Luciano — Dois Tempos, Parte 2
 Fernando & Sorocaba — Sou Do Interior (Ao Vivo)
 Michel Teló — Bem Sertanejo - O Show

Best Portuguese Language Roots Album
Almir Sater and Renato Teixeira — +A3
 Anastácia — Dequele Jeito!
 Mariza — Mariza
 Sara Tavares  — Fitxadu
 Borghetti Yamandu — Borghetti Yamandu

Best Portuguese Language Song
Chico Buarque — "As Caravanas"
 Pedro Baby, Pretinho Da Serrinha and Tribalistas — "Aliança" (Tribalistas)
 Nanda Costa, Lan Lan and Sambê — "Aponte" (Maria Bethânia)
 Erasmo Carlos, Dadi and Marisa Monte — "Convite Para Nascer De Novo" (Erasmo Carlos)
 Lucas Cirillo and Xenia — "Pra Que Me Chamas?" (Xenia)

Children's
Best Latin Children’s Album
Claraluna — Imaginare
 Ana & Gio — Ana & Gio
 Mundo Bita — Bita e a Natureza
 Luis Pescetti y Amigos  — Magia Todo el Día
 Colectivo Animal — Un Bosque Encantado 2

Classical
Best Classical Album
Claudia Montero — Mágica y Misteriosa
 Allison Brewster Franzetti and Carlos Franzetti — Buenos Aires Noir
 José Menor — Enrique Granados: Goyescas
 José Serebrier — José Serebrier Conducts Granados
 Brasil Guitar Duo and David Amado — Leo Brouwer: The Book Of Signs, Paulo Bellinati: Concerto Caboclo

Best Classical Contemporary Composition
Claudia Montero — "Luces y Sombras. Concierto Para Guitarra y Orquesta De Cuerdas"
 Roberto Sierra — "Montuno En Forma De Chacona" (Silvia Márquez)
 Eddie Mora — "Ofrenda" (Eddie Mora directing The Orquesta Sinfónica De Heredia)
 Jorge Mejia — "Prelude In F Major For Piano & Orchestra" (Jorge Mejia and The Henry Mancini Institute Orchestra)
 Yalil Guerra — "String Quartet Nº.3 (In Memoriam Ludvvig Van Beethoven)" (La Catrina String Quartet)

Arrangement
Best Arrangement
Milton Salcedo — "Se Le Ve" (Milton Salcedo featuring Amaury Gutiérrez, Carlos Oliva y Michel Puche)
 Luiz Cláudio Ramos — "Massarandupió" (Chico Buarque)
 Rigoberto Alfaro — "No Me Platiques Más (Instrumental)" (Mariachi Divas de Cindy Shea)
 Lisandro Baum — "Batango" (Quinteto Bataraz)
 Vagner Cunha — "Campos Neutrais" (Vitor Ramil)

Recording Package
Best Recording Package
Carlos Sadness — Diferentes Tipos De Luz
 Miguel Vásquez "Masa" — La Gira (Sibilino)
 Daniel Eizirik — Meio Que Tudo É Um (Apanhador Só)
 Rubén Chumillas — Mismo Sitio, Distinto Lugar (Vetusta Morla)
 Christian Montenegro and Laura Varsky — 9 (Marco Sanguinetti)

Production
Best Engineered Album
Rafa Sardina and Eric Boulanger — 50 Años Tocando Para Ti (Orquesta Filarmónica De Bogotá)
 Gustavo Borner, Justin Moshkevich and Nick Baxter — Feliz (Nahuel Pennisi)
 Leo Bracht and Felipe Tichauer — Noturno (Anaadi)
 Thiago Baggio and Rodrigo Sanches — Rei Ninguém (Arthur Nogueira)
 Carles Campi Campón, Ernesto García, Pablo Martín Jones and Matías Cella — Salvavidas De Hielo (Jorge Drexler)

Producer of the Year
Linda Briceño 
 Rafael Arcaute
Visitante
Andrés Torres and Mauricio Rengifo
Julio Reyes Copello

Music video
Best Short Form Music Video
Juanes — "Pa Dentro"
 Bomba Estéreo — "Duele"
 Residente and Dillon Francis Featuring Ile — "Sexo"
 Residente — "Guerra"
 Rosalía — "Malamente"

Best Long Form Music Video
Pedro Capó — En Letra De Otro - Documentary
 La Santa Cecilia — Amar y Vivir Documentary
 Los Pericos — 3.000 Vivos
 Various Artists — Un Mundo Raro: Las Canciones De José Alfredo Jiménez
 Zoé — Panoramas

Multiple Nominations and Awards

The following received multiple nominations:

Eight
J Balvin
Five
Rosalía
El David Aguilar
Four
Kany García
Jorge Drexler
Natalia Lafourcade
Mauricio Rengifo
Andrés Torres 
Three
Chico Buarque
Monsieur Periné
Pablo Alborán
Nicky Jam
Bomba Estéreo
Anaadi
Christian Nodal
Zoé
Two
Rozalén
Karol G
Luis Miguel
Laura Pausini
Carlos Vives
Laura Pausini
Willy William
Residente
Fito Páez
Laura Pausini
Ángela Aguilar
Nana Mendoza
Claudia Prieto
Daddy Yankee
Enrique Bunbury
Richard Coleman
Él Mató a un Policía Motorizado
Aterciopelados
Dante Spinetta
Vetusta Morla
Silvestre Dangond
Víctor Manuelle
Jorge Luis Piloto
Calibre 50
Xenia
Erasmo Carlos

References

External links
 Official Site

2018 in Latin music
2018 in Nevada
2018 music awards
2018
November 2018 events in the United States
Latin Grammy Awards, 19